Sweepstakes, stylized as $weepstake$, is an American anthology television series that aired in the United States on NBC during the 1978-79 television season. It depicts the lives of people who hope to win a large amount of money in a sweepstakes and what happens after they win — or do not win — the money.

Synopsis
$weepstake$ is an anthology series that depicts the lives of people who buy tickets for a state-owned lottery hosted by a master of ceremonies, "the $weepstake$ M.C."<ref name=buck197901026>[https://www.newspapers.com/newspage/263288350/ Buck, Jerry, "Sweepstakes′ New Twist on Millionaire," Associated Press, in The Journal and Courier (Lafayette, Indiana), January 26, 1979, p. 15.]</ref> Each episode depicts a week in which 12 people became finalists in that week's lottery, and the first half of the episode introduces the three finalists who are destined to win either the $1 million jackpot or one of the two $1,000 consolation prizes, the issues in their lives, and their plans to use the $1 million jackpot if they win it. At the midpoint of each episode, the $weepstake$ M.C. hosts the lottery drawing and announces the winner of the jackpot and that the other two finalists the episode focuses on have won the consolation prizes. The second half of the episode then tells the story of the effect of the lottery on the three winners — how the jackpot winner spends his or her money and how the two consolation prize winners fare after their loss.

The only regular in the series is the $weepstake$ M.C.;Brooks and Marsh, pp. 1003–1004. each episode otherwise has a cast consisting entirely of guest stars and has storylines unrelated to those of other  episodes. Some of the stories told in $weepstake$ are comedic in nature and others are dramatic. The most deserving finalist does not always win the jackpot.

Cast
 Edd Byrnes...The $weepstake$ M.C.

Production notes$weepstake$ represented an update of the successful 1950s CBS anthology series The Millionaire, in each episode of which an anonymous  benefactor gave someone $1 million and the story of the effect of sudden wealth on their lives followed. $weepstake$ differed from The Millionaire in that rather than depicting merely the impact of wealth on someone′s life, episodes were constructed to allow viewers to pick their favorite finalist during the first half, see whether or not that finalist won the jackpot, and then see the result of either winning or losing on their lives.

Miller-Milkis Productions produced $weepstake$ in association with Paramount Television. Robert Dozier served as executive producer.

Critical reception

An article published in the January 26, 1979, edition of The Record of Hackensack, New Jersey, described $weepstake$ as an "unsophisticated anthology series" and added that on Friday evenings NBC's "string of intelligent shows is broken at 10 to 11," which was the time slot in which the network broadcast $weepstake$.

Broadcast history$weepstake$ premiered on NBC on January 26, 1979.  NBC scheduled it as part of a slate of midseason replacement shows that debuted that evening to follow the successful Diff'rent Strokes: In order, NBC's new Friday line-up consisted of Diff′rent Strokes, Brothers and Sisters, Turnabout, Hello, Larry, and $weepstake$. Other than Diff′rent Strokes, the new line-up failed with audiences; out of 63 programs broadcast that week, Brothers and Sisters ranked 51st, Turnabout 50th, Hello, Larry 52nd, and $weepstake$ 59th. $weepstake$ continued to struggle in the ratings and was cancelled after just over two months on the air. Its ninth and final episode was broadcast on March 30, 1979. It aired at 10:00 PM Eastern Time on Friday throughout its run. It

Episodes
SOURCESIMDB Sweepstakes (1979) Episode List Accessed March 13, 2022Television listing, The Indianapolis Star (Indianapolis, Indiana), January 26, 1979, p. 31.Television listing, The Daily News (New York, New York), February 2, 1979, p. 64.Television listing, The Pantagraph (Bloomington, Illinois), February 2, 1979, p. 7.Television listing, Arizona Daily Star (Tucson, Arizona), February 2, 1979, p. 28.Television listing, The Paducah Sun (Paducah, Kentucky), February 2, 1979, p. 35.Television listing, The News-Messenger (Fremont, Ohio), February 9, 1979, p. 19.Television listing, Casper Star-Tribune(Casper, Wyoming), February 16, 1979, p. 22.Television listing, The Pantagraph (Bloomington, Illinois), February 16, 1979, p. 13.Television listing, The Daily News (New York, New York), February 23, 1979, p. 99.Television listing, Dayton Daily News (Dayton, Ohio), February 23, 1979, p. 54.Television listing, The Daily News (New York, New York), March 2, 1979, p. 83.Television listing, The Kokomo Tribune (Kokomo, Indiana), March 2, 1979, p. 11.Television listing, The Daily American (Somerset, Pennsylvania), March 9, 1979, p. 16.Television listing, The Pantagraph (Bloomington, Illinois), March 23, 1979, p. 12.Television listing, St. Louis Post-Dispatch (St. Louis, Missouri), March 23, 1979, p. 58.Television listing, The Daily Register(Red Bank, New Jersey), March 23, 1979, p. 9.Television listing, Longview News-Journal (Longview, Texas), March 30, 1979, p. 29.

References
Footnotes

Bibliography
Brooks, Tim, and Earle Marsh, The Complete Directory to Prime-Time Network and Cable TV Shows, 1946-Present (Sixth Edition), New York: Ballantine Books, 1995, .
 McNeil, Alex, Total Television: The Comprehensive Guide to Programming From 1948 to the Present, Fourth Edition'', New York: Penguin Books, 1996, p. 404.

External links
 
 $weepstake$ episode opening credits on February 2, 1979, on YouTube
 $weepstake$ episode preview and opening credits on March 2, 1979, on YouTube

1979 American television series debuts
1979 American television series endings
1970s American anthology television series
NBC original programming
Television series by CBS Studios
English-language television shows
Works about lotteries
Television shows set in the United States